The 2000 Montana Grizzlies football team represented the University of Montana in the 2000 NCAA Division I-AA football season. The Grizzlies were led by first-year head coach Joe Glenn and played their home games at Washington–Grizzly Stadium.

Schedule

Roster

References

Montana
Montana Grizzlies football seasons
Big Sky Conference football champion seasons
Montana Grizzlies football